New Writings in SF 16 is an anthology of science fiction short stories edited by John Carnell, the sixteenth volume in a series of thirty, of which he edited the first twenty-one. It was first published in hardcover by Dennis Dobson in 1970, followed by a paperback edition issued under the slightly variant title New Writings in SF -- 16 by Corgi the same year.

The book collects six novelettes and short stories by various science fiction authors, with a foreword by Carnell.

Contents
"Foreword" (John Carnell)
"Getaway from Getawehi" (Colin Kapp)
"All Done by Mirrors" (Douglas R. Mason)
"Throwback" (Sydney J. Bounds)
"The Perihelion Man" (Christopher Priest)
"R26/5/PSY and I" (Michael G. Coney)
"Meatball" (James White)

External links

1970 anthologies
16